Tennis at the 2019 Military World Games was held in Wuhan, China from 22 to 26 October 2019.

Medal summary

Results

Medal table

Men's singles

Draw

Men's doubles

Draw

Women's singles

Draw

Women's doubles

Draw

Mixed doubles

Draw

References

External links
Tennis tournament of the 7th Military World Games - Official website of the 2019 Military World Games
Results book

Tennis
2019